Henri Agarande (13 September 1920, in Fort-de-France, Martinique – 6 August 1983, in Cayenne) was a politician from Martinique who served and represented French Guiana in the French Senate from 1978–1980.

References 
 page on the French Senate website

1920 births
1983 deaths
People from Fort-de-France
Socialist Party (France) politicians
French Senators of the Fifth Republic
Martiniquais politicians
French people of Martiniquais descent
Senators of French Guiana